Godfrey is an unincorporated community and census-designated place in Morgan County, in the U.S. state of Georgia. It first appeared as a CDP in the 2020 Census with a population of 108.

History
The community was named after Dr. Ervine Godfrey, a pioneer settler. A post office called Godfrey was established in 1889, and remained in operation until 1965. The Georgia General Assembly incorporated the place as the "Town of Godfrey" in 1906. The town's charter was dissolved in 1995.

Geography
Godfrey is in southern Morgan County, with its southern border following the Putnam County line.

The town sits on a ridge which drains west to the Little River and east to Big Indian Creek, a tributary of the Little River, which continues south to the Oconee River north of Milledgeville.

Demographics

2020 census

Note: the US Census treats Hispanic/Latino as an ethnic category. This table excludes Latinos from the racial categories and assigns them to a separate category. Hispanics/Latinos can be of any race.

References

Former municipalities in Georgia (U.S. state)
Unincorporated communities in Morgan County, Georgia
Populated places disestablished in 1995
Census-designated places in Morgan County, Georgia